Marte Maaland Eberson is a Norwegian keyboardist and composer, known from bands including Morning Has Occurred and Highasakite. She is the daughter of the guitarist Jon Eberson.

Career 

Eberson was born in Oslo, and obtained her formal musical education from the Music program at Foss videregående skole, "Sund Folkehøgskole", followed by a bachelor's degree from the Jazz program at Griegakademiet (UiB) in Bergen. She is involved in many different bands and various musical contexts, most recently with the band Eberson Funk Ensemble, a band including her guitarist father Jon Eberson, Pål Thowsen, Sigurd Hole and Kim Erik Pedersen at Victoria, the Norwegian National Jazz Scene in Oslo 2013.

In 2011, Eberson won the "Jazz i sikte" ("Jazz in sight") with the band Lugom Trio and placed second in the "Urørt" final with the electronica duo Machine Birds. In 2012, she won the "Jazz i sikte" with the ensemble Morning Has Occurred, fronted by Natalie Sandtorv. Also in 2012, she was awarded the Sildajazzprisen. She was also a member of the critically acclaimed indie band Highasakite until 2018, and has been playing with Sjur Miljeteig Group since 2014.

Honors 
2012: Sildajazzprisen

Discography

Solo albums 
2015: Mad Boy (Propeller Recordings)

Collaborations 
With Machine Birds
2012: Save Yourself (Nabovarsel)
2013: Time / One Last Try (Machine Birds Records)

With Ine Hoem
2013: "The Island"

With Highasakite
2012: All That Floats Will Rain (Propeller Recordings)
2014: Silent Treatment (Propeller Recordings)
2016: "Camp Echo" (Propeller Recordings)

With Morning Has Occurred
2014: Morning Has Occurred (Ocean Sound Recordings)

With Eberson Funk Ensemble
2014: Do The Dance (JEG Records)

With Cokko
2016: The Dance Upon My Grave (Playdate Records)

References

External links 
Official Twitter page
Machine Birds, Performing At Nattjazz 2011 at All About Jazz
Highasakite website
Starbox Music - Management website
«Flying start» på karrieren Bergen Student-TV (in Norwegian)

21st-century Norwegian pianists
Norwegian jazz pianists
Norwegian keyboardists
Norwegian jazz composers
Grieg Academy alumni
University of Bergen alumni
Musicians from Oslo
Living people
Morning Has Occurred members
Year of birth missing (living people)